Below are the squads for the 2006 AFC Challenge Cup in Bangladesh, that took place between 1 April and 16 April 2006.  The players' listed age is their age on the tournament's opening day (1 April 2006).

Group A

India
Coach:  Islam Akhmedov
The AIFF sent the India U-20 team for this tournament, therefore no caps at any level are displayed.

Afghanistan
Coach:  Klaus Stärk

Chinese Taipei
Coach:  Toshiaki Imai

Philippines
Coach: Jose Ariston Caslib

Group B

Sri Lanka
Coach: Sampath Perera

Brunei
Coach: Mohd Ali Mustafa

Nepal
Coach: Shyam Thapa

Bhutan
Coach: Kharga Basnet

Group C

Bangladesh
Coach:  Diego Cruciani

Cambodia
Coach:  Jo Yong-Chol

Palestine
Coach: Mohammed Sabaah

Guam
Coach:  Norio Tsukitate

Group D

Tajikistan
Coach: Sharif Nazarov

Macau
Coach:  Masanaga Kageyama

Kyrgyzstan
Coach: Boris Podkorytov

Pakistan
Coach:  Salman Shareeda

External links 
AFC Challenge Cup at AFC (Results & match summaries with squad lists) 

2006
squads